In Greek mythology, Androgeus or Androgeos (Ancient Greek: Ἀνδρόγεως, Latin: Androgeum or Androgeōs derived from andros "of a man" and geos, genitive gē "earth, land") was a Cretan prince as the son of King Minos.

Family 
Androgeus' mother was Pasiphaë, daughter of Helios. He was the brother of Acacallis, Ariadne, Deucalion, Phaedra, Glaucus, Catreus and Xenodice. Androgeus's sons were Sthenelus and Alcaeus, who later became companions of Heracles.

Mythology 
Androgeus was murdered in Athens. Sources vary as to the exact circumstances of his death.

Some stated that Androgeus participated in the Panathenaic Games and took all the prizes, whereupon he directed to Thebes to take part in another contest in honor of Laius, but was ambushed and killed by his envious would-be competitors.

Servius suggests that Androgeus was murdered upon his triumph by the Athenians themselves and the Megarians. Plutarch writes that Androgeus "was thought to have been treacherously killed", without clarifying whether this was supposed to be the truth or not.

In another version, Aegeus, King of Athens, sent him against the Marathonian Bull which resulted in Androgeus's death.

In Pausanias' interpretation, Androgeus being killed by the bull is presented as more of an accident, which, however, Minos is remarked to not have believed.

According to Diodorus Siculus, Aegeus killed Androgeus out of fear that the latter would support the sons of Pallas against him. In yet another version, Androgeus was killed in a battle between the Athenians and the Cretans.

The Athenians eventually established a hero cult of Androgeus: there was an altar dedicated to him at Phaleron.

The consequences of Androgeus's death are described in the Bibliotheca as follows. Minos received the news of his son's death when he was performing a sacrificial rite in honor of the Charites at Paros. Overcome by grief, he threw off his garland and ordered for the music to stop, but did complete the sacrifice, from which circumstance the festivals in honor of the Charites at Paros involved no music or flowers from then on. Minos led a war against Athens to avenge the death of his son, but failed to sack the city and prayed to Zeus that the Athenians may be punished. The city was struck with famine and pestilence. The Athenians consulted an oracle as to how to avert the calamity, and were instructed to sacrifice the daughters of Hyacinthus the Lacedaemonian, but this did not help. The citizens consulted the oracle once again and were told to give Minos whatever he might ask in retribution. The king obliged the Athenians to send several youths every seven or nine years to be devoured by the Minotaur. This continued until the Minotaur was killed by Theseus.

Propertius in one of his elegies refers to a version in which Androgeus was brought back to life by Asclepius.

Notes

References 

 Diodorus Siculus, The Library of History translated by Charles Henry Oldfather. Twelve volumes. Loeb Classical Library. Cambridge, Massachusetts: Harvard University Press; London: William Heinemann, Ltd. 1989. Vol. 3. Books 4.59–8. Online version at Bill Thayer's Web Site
 Diodorus Siculus, Bibliotheca Historica. Vol 1-2. Immanel Bekker. Ludwig Dindorf. Friedrich Vogel. in aedibus B. G. Teubneri. Leipzig. 1888–1890. Greek text available at the Perseus Digital Library.
 Gaius Julius Hyginus, Fabulae from The Myths of Hyginus translated and edited by Mary Grant. University of Kansas Publications in Humanistic Studies. Online version at the Topos Text Project.
 Lucius Mestrius Plutarchus, Lives with an English Translation by Bernadotte Perrin. Cambridge, MA. Harvard University Press. London. William Heinemann Ltd. 1914. 1. Online version at the Perseus Digital Library. Greek text available from the same website.
 Maurus Servius Honoratus, In Vergilii carmina comentarii. Servii Grammatici qui feruntur in Vergilii carmina commentarii; recensuerunt Georgius Thilo et Hermannus Hagen. Georgius Thilo. Leipzig. B. G. Teubner. 1881. Online version at the Perseus Digital Library.
 Pausanias, Description of Greece with an English Translation by W.H.S. Jones, Litt.D., and H.A. Ormerod, M.A., in 4 Volumes. Cambridge, MA, Harvard University Press; London, William Heinemann Ltd. 1918. Online version at the Perseus Digital Library
 Pausanias, Graeciae Descriptio. 3 vols. Leipzig, Teubner. 1903.  Greek text available at the Perseus Digital Library.
 Pseudo-Apollodorus, The Library with an English Translation by Sir James George Frazer, F.B.A., F.R.S. in 2 Volumes, Cambridge, MA, Harvard University Press; London, William Heinemann Ltd. 1921. Online version at the Perseus Digital Library. Greek text available from the same website.
 Sextus Propertius, Elegies from Charm. Vincent Katz. trans. Los Angeles. Sun & Moon Press. 1995. Online version at the Perseus Digital Library. Latin text available at the same website.
Princes in Greek mythology
Cretan characters in Greek mythology